The Halifax version of the NWA Canadian Heavyweight Championship was first defended in the Eastern Sports Association only in 1977, the year the promotion closed. The title was imported from George Cannon's 'Canadian Wrestling' based in Ontario.

In late 2012, Atlantic Canadian Championship Wrestling and the National Wrestling Alliance formed a partnership to create NWA Atlantic Canada. The NWA Canadian Heavyweight Championship (Halifax/Maritimes) will be used as the company's top championship. An eight-man tournament was held beginning in March 2013 to crown the first NWA Canadian Heavyweight Champion (Halifax/Maritimes) since 1977. On April 5, 2013, JB Havoc won the NWA Canadian Heavyweight title in a record setting 29 seconds, which is credited with being the quickest title match in the history of the National Wrestling Alliance.

History

References

External links
NWA Halifax Canadian Heavyweight title history
Vance Nevada's Canadian Wrestling Results Archive (1970s Eastern Canada section - scroll down to 1977)

National Wrestling Alliance championships
Heavyweight wrestling championships
Canadian professional wrestling championships
Professional wrestling in Nova Scotia